How Sweet the Sound: 25 Favorite Hymns and Gospel Greats is a studio double album by American rock band the Charlie Daniels Band. The album sees the band performing Christian hymns in their style. According to Daniels, "I didn’t want to do it in a churchy way, [...] I wanted to do it like CDB would do it." Released on January 29, 2002 through Sparrow Records, the album peaked at number 40 on the Top Country Albums chart.

Track listing

Disc 1
 "Amazing Grace"
 "Precious Lord, Take My Hand"
 "In the Garden"
 "Softly and Tenderly"
 "Abide with Me"
 "I Saw the Light"
 "Just a Closer Walk with Thee"
 "Just a Little Talk with Jesus"
 "Swing Down Sweet Chariot"
 "Nothing but the Blood"
 "I'll Fly Away"
 "How Great Thou Art"

Disc 2
 "Somebody Was Praying for Me"
 "They Tell Me of a Home"
 "Are You Washed in the Blood"
 "The Old Rugged Cross"
 "What a Friend We Have in Jesus"
 "Blessed Assurance"
 "Peace in the Valley"
 "In the Sweet By-and-By"
 "I am Thine O Lord"
 "Come Unto Me"
 "Kneel at the Cross"
 "Life's Railway to Heaven"
 "There is Power in the Blood"

Personnel
Charlie Daniels - Banjo, acoustic bass, fiddle, electric guitar, mandolin
Joel "Taz" DiGregorio - Keyboards, Hammond organ, piano
Charlie Hayward - Acoustic bass, electric bass
Chris Wormer - String arrangements
Pat McDonald - Drums, percussion
Darryl Appleton - Choir, chorus
Bonnie Bramlett - Background vocals
Bruce Ray Brown - Acoustic guitar, electric guitar, background vocals
Reginald Brown - Choir, chorus
Albert E. Brumley - Background vocals
Theresa Comer - Choir, chorus
Carolyn Corlew - Background vocals
Angel Cruz - Background vocals
Everett Drake - Choir, chorus
Mark Matejka - Acoustic guitar, electric guitar, background vocals
Ann McCrary - Choir, chorus
Michael Mellett - Background vocals
Gene Miller - Background vocals
Tony Skinner - Background vocals

Charts

References

2002 albums
Charlie Daniels albums
Sparrow Records albums